Nicole Jackson may refer to:

Nicole Jackson (ice hockey)
Nicole Jackson (The Killing), fictional character